Madinat al Haqq is a village in Taqah, Dhofar Governorate,  in southwestern Oman.

References

Populated places in the Dhofar Governorate